Hellnahraun is a lava field between Arnarstapi and Hellnar in Snæfellsnes, Iceland.  The source of  Hellnahraun lava field is a crater near Jökulháls , now covered by the Snæfellsjökull glacier. The estimated age of the lava field is 3,900 years.

Volcanism of Iceland
Columnar basalts in Iceland